The Gabharu River is a northern bank tributary of the Brahmaputra River in the Indian state of Assam. The Gabharu river originates in the Kalafangapo  hills of Arunachal Pradesh in the West Kameng District and flows through Sonitpur district of Assam before its confluence with the Brahmaputra river at Gadharu Mukh (Chapari Gaon) of Sonitpur district. The Gabharu river consists of two right bank subtributaries known as  Sonairupai river and Gelgeli river and Mora Depota river is the left bank sub tributary.

References 

Rivers of Assam
Rivers of India